Shurskol is a village (selo) in Rostovsky District of Yaroslavl Oblast, Russia. The nearest railway station, Rostov-Yaroslavsky, is 9 km from the village. Shurskol is located on the left bank of the Mazikha River, covering the slopes of two gentle hills, forming a ravine. Population: , the area is 1.1 km².

References

Rural localities in Yaroslavl Oblast